The following are the national records in track cycling in France maintained by France's national cycling federation: Fédération Française de Cyclisme.

Men

Women

Notes

References
General
French Cycling Records 20 October 2021 updated
Specific

External links
Fédération Française de Cyclisme web site

French
Records
Track cycling
track cycling